Lotte Hedeager (born February 24, 1948) is a Danish archaeologist who is Professor of Archaeology at the University of Oslo.

Biography
Lotte Hedeager was born in Copenhagen on February 24, 1948. She gained her MA in prehistoric archaeology at the University of Copenhagen in 1978, and her PhD at the University of Århus in 1990. In 1996, Hedeager was appointed Professor of Archaeology at the University of Oslo. She specializes in the study of Iron Age Scandinavia. She is a fellow of the Norwegian Academy of Science and Letters.

Selected works
 Iron Age Societies. From Tribe to State in Northern Europe, 1992

References

External links
 Lotte Hedeager at the website of the University of Oslo

1948 births
Aarhus University alumni
Danish archaeologists
Danish emigrants to Norway
Living people
Members of the Norwegian Academy of Science and Letters
Members of the Royal Danish Academy of Sciences and Letters
Prehistorians
Royal Norwegian Society of Sciences and Letters
University of Copenhagen alumni
Academic staff of the University of Oslo
Danish women archaeologists